Rigoberto Jovany Sanchez (born September 8, 1994) is an American football punter for the Indianapolis Colts of the National Football League (NFL). He played college football at Hawaii and was signed by the Colts as an undrafted free agent in 2017.

Early years
Sanchez attended and played high school football at Hamilton Union High School in Hamilton City, California .

College career
Sanchez initially played football for Butte Community College in Oroville, California, located roughly 30 miles southeast of Hamilton City before transferring to the University of Hawaii. While at Hawaii, Sanchez played on the Hawaii Rainbow Warriors for the 2015 and 2016 seasons. During the 2015 season, he punted 74 times for 3,335 net yards for a 45.1 average. He handled placekicking duties and converted 23 of 24 extra point attempts and 8 of 11 field goal attempts. In 2016, he punted 70 times for 3,122 net yards for a 44.6 average. He converted 49 of 50 extra point attempts and all 13 field goal attempts.

Collegiate statistics

Professional career

Sanchez was signed by the Indianapolis Colts as an undrafted free agent on May 4, 2017. He won the Colts' starting punter job as a rookie after beating out veteran Jeff Locke.

On September 10, 2017, Sanchez made his NFL debut in the season opener against the Los Angeles Rams at the Los Angeles Memorial Coliseum. In the 46–9 loss, he punted six times for 302 total yards for a 50.30 average. Overall, in his rookie season, he totaled 84 punts for 3,764 net yards for a 44.81 average. In the 2018 season, he had 57 punts for 2,629 net yards for a 46.12 average. In the 2019 season, he had 59 punts for 2,619 net yards for a 44.39 average.

On June 4, 2019, Sanchez signed a four-year, $11.6 million contract extension with the Colts through the 2023 season.

In Week 4 of the 2021 season, Sanchez averaged 50 yards per punt on four punts, including two inside the 20, in a 27–17 win over the Dolphins, earning AFC Special Teams Player of the Week.

In Week 7 of the 2021 season, Sanchez kicked the longest punt of his career, and in Colts history, 79 yards, in a 30–18 win over the 49ers. He earned AFC Special Teams Player of the Week for his performance.

On August 31, 2022, Sanchez was placed on season-ending injured reserve after suffering a torn Achilles.

Personal life
Sanchez grew up playing soccer before joining his high school's football team. He is of Mexican descent.

Rigoberto met his wife, Cynthia, when they attended junior college together.  Cynthia grew up in the nearby community of Corning, CA.  After receiving blessings from her family, he proposed to her at the Circle of Lights at Monument Circle in downtown Indianapolis on December 26, 2017.  They were married the following spring.

On November 30, 2020, it was announced he would under go surgery the next day to have a cancerous tumor removed. The surgery was reported as successful and he returned to practice two weeks later.

References

External links
Hawaii Rainbow Warriors bio
Indianapolis Colts bio

1994 births
Living people
American football punters
American sportspeople of Mexican descent
Butte Roadrunners football players
Hawaii Rainbow Warriors football players
Indianapolis Colts players
People from Glenn County, California
Players of American football from California
Ed Block Courage Award recipients